Edward Alcock (7 September 1913 – 1981) was a footballer who played as an outside left in the Football League for Tranmere Rovers. He also played for Congleton Town.

References

English footballers
Congleton Town F.C. players
Tranmere Rovers F.C. players
English Football League players
1913 births
1981 deaths
People from Congleton
Association football wingers